Sammy Stewart (born 1954) is an American baseball pitcher (Baltimore Orioles)

Sammy Stewart may also refer to:

Sammy Stewart (boxer) (born 1969), Liberian boxer
Sammy Stewart (footballer, born 1920) (1920–1995), Scottish footballer (East Fife FC)
Sammy Stewart (footballer, born 1991), Northern Irish footballer (Aberdeen FC)

See also
Samuel Stewart (disambiguation)